Chapar Ghata is a fort village in Kanpur Dehat district in the state of Uttar Pradesh, India.

Chapar Ghata is located in Amraudha block of Bhognipur tehsil. It occupies the site of an old crossing on the Sengar River. There is a fort made during Mughal Period, along with a bridge on the Mughal Road (NH 2A) over the Sengar River. Since old Mughal Road passes through the village, there is a Kos Minar in its vicinity, and also at Rajpur and Khalaspur.

The nearest railway station is at Pukhrayan.

Demographics
As of 2001 India census, Chapar Ghata had a population of 2790. Males constitute 52.5% of the population, and females 42.5%.

Forts in Uttar Pradesh
Villages in Kanpur Dehat district